The International Cancer Imaging Society (ICIS) is a London-based organisation for medical imaging.

History
It was founded in 1998.

Structure
It is headquartered in London.

Function
It produces the journal Cancer Imaging, published since the year 2000.  It conducts teaching courses, and holds an annual conference (Annual Meeting).

Annual Meetings
2016 Annual Meeting was held in Glasgow. 2017 Annual Meeting was held in Berlin. 2018 Annual Meeting was held in Menton. 2019 Annual Meeting was held in Verona. 2020 Annual Meeting will be held in London.

See also
 Positron emission tomography
 Positron emission tomography–magnetic resonance imaging
 Royal College of Radiologists

References

External links
 ICIS
 Cancer Imaging

1998 establishments in the United Kingdom
Cancer organisations based in the United Kingdom
Medical imaging organizations
Medical and health organisations based in London
Scientific organizations established in 1998